Uptown/Downtown is a 1988 live album by McCoy Tyner released on the Milestone label, his first for the label since 13th House (1980). It was recorded in November 1988 and features performances by Tyner's Big Band, which included tenor saxophonists Junior Cook and Ricky Ford, trumpeter Kamau Adilifu and trombonist Steve Turre, recorded at the Blue Note jazz club in New York City. The Allmusic review by Scott Yanow states that "the results are quite memorable and frequently exciting. Recommended".

Track listing 
 "Love Surrounds Us Everywhere" - 8:25  
 "Three Flowers" - 6:56  
 "Genesis" - 7:57  
 "Uptown" - 7:11  
 "Lotus Flower" (Turre) - 6:52  
 "Blues for Basie" - 9:34  
All compositions by McCoy Tyner except as indicated
Recorded at the Blue Note, NYC, November 25 & 26, 1988.

Personnel 
 McCoy Tyner: piano, arranger
 Kamau Adilifu: trumpet
 Earl Gardner: trumpet
 Virgil Jones: trumpet
 Robin Eubanks: trombone, arranger
 Steve Turre: trombone, didgeridoo, arranger
 John Clark french horn
 Howard Johnson: tuba
 Joe Ford: alto saxophone, soprano saxophone, flute
 Doug Harris: alto saxophone, soprano saxophone, flute
 Junior Cook: tenor saxophone
 Ricky Ford: tenor saxophone
 Avery Sharpe: double bass, electric bass
 Louis Hayes: drums
 Dennis Denizia, Jerry Hey: arrangers

References 

1989 live albums
McCoy Tyner live albums
Milestone Records live albums